Fundu Văii may refer to several villages in Romania:

 Fundu Văii, a village in Pânceşti Commune, Bacău County
 Fundu Văii, a village in Lipovăț Commune, Vaslui County
 Fundu Văii, a village in Poienești Commune, Vaslui County